Euptera zowa, or Fox's euptera, is a butterfly in the family Nymphalidae. It is found in Sierra Leone, Liberia, Ivory Coast, Ghana, Togo and Nigeria. The habitat consists of forests.

Adult males mud-puddle.

References

Butterflies described in 1965
Euptera